Savatiano (foaled 7 September 2014) is a retired, multiple stakes winning Australian bred thoroughbred racehorse.

Background

A Darley homebred, Savatiano is a half-sister to Athiri (Lonhro), who was placed in the Blue Diamond Prelude Fillies, Kindergarten Stakes and Magic Night Stakes.   Her second dam Star Shiraz won the G1 Sires' Produce Stakes and was placed in the G1 Coolmore Classic and the TJ Smith Classic.

Racing career

Savatiano is the winner of 12 races which includes 7 Stakes races.  Her most prestigious win was the 2021 Canterbury Stakes at Group 1 level. However, twelve months later she was disqualified from this race for returning a positive swab to a prohibited substance.

Pedigree

References 

Australian racehorses
Racehorses bred in Australia
Racehorses trained in Australia
2014 racehorse births
Thoroughbred family 2-h